Craig Anderson may refer to:
 Craig Anderson (actor), Australian writer and actor
Craig Anderson (bishop) (born 1942), American bishop
 Craig Anderson (ice hockey) (born 1981), NHL goaltender
 Craig Anderson (1960s pitcher) (born 1938), former Major League Baseball pitcher
 Craig Anderson (2010s pitcher) (born 1980), Australian-born minor league baseball pitcher in the Baltimore Orioles organization
 Craig Anderson (motocross), Australian motocross rider
 Craig Anderson, producer/director, first director of the play On Golden Pond
 Craig A. Anderson, American psychology professor at Iowa State University